Kyra Cheresse Constantine (born August 1, 1998) is a Canadian sprinter specializing in the 400 metres. She won the silver medal in the women's  metres relay event at the 2019 Pan American Games held in Lima, Peru. She also competed in the women's 400 metres event.

In 2014, she competed in the girls' 400 metres event at the Summer Youth Olympics held in Nanjing, China.

She competed in the women's 400 metres event at the 2020 Summer Olympics held in Tokyo, Japan. As well, she was part of the Canadian team that finished in fourth place in the  metres relay.

She attended St. Roch Secondary School as a high school student.

References

External links 
 

Living people
1998 births
Athletes from Toronto
Canadian female sprinters
Athletes (track and field) at the 2014 Summer Youth Olympics
Athletes (track and field) at the 2019 Pan American Games
Athletes (track and field) at the 2020 Summer Olympics
Olympic female sprinters
Olympic track and field athletes of Canada
Pan American Games medalists in athletics (track and field)
Pan American Games silver medalists for Canada
Medalists at the 2019 Pan American Games
Commonwealth Games gold medallists for Canada
Commonwealth Games medallists in athletics
Athletes (track and field) at the 2022 Commonwealth Games
USC Trojans women's track and field athletes
Sportspeople from Brampton
Track and field athletes from Ontario
21st-century Canadian women
Medallists at the 2022 Commonwealth Games